Oswald Francis Mingay (1 July 1895 – 8 August 1973) was a public servant, wireless signalman in the Australian Army during World War I, and an early wireless experimenter. He was, however, best known as a journalist, editor, and publisher of radio-related publications over several decades. He was radio manager for Burgin Electric, and influenced that firm to establish Australia's first Class B broadcasting station in 1924.

During this time, Mingay ran his own radio manufacturing business. His publishing career commenced in 1930 with "The Radio Retailer of Australia".

Artifacts
 Museums Victoria Jenvey's Coherer, used for communication with St. George, 1901 Museums Victoria

Publications
 Jenvey, H. W. Practical Telegraphy: A Guide for the Use of Officers of the Victorian Post and Telegraph Department, Vol. 1 (2nd edition, Melbourne, 1891) Trove

Further reading
 Australian Dictionary of Biography (Jim Symes). (Canberra, 2018)
 Carty, Bruce. Australian Radio History (4th ed. Sydney, 2013) 
 Curnow, Geoffrey Ross. The History of the Development of Wireless Telegraphy and Broadcasting in Australia to 1942, With Especial Reference to the Australian Broadcasting Commission: A Political and Administrative Study.
 Jolly, Rhonda. Media Ownership and Regulation: A Chronology (Canberra, 2016
 MacKinnon, Colin (VK2YDM). Oswald Francis Mingay 
 Australian War Memorial. Honours and Awards, Mentioned in Despatches, Oswald Francis Mingay.
 Australian War Memorial. Honours and Awards, Mentioned in Despatches, Oswald Francis Mingay.
 National Library of Australia. Biographical Cuttings on Oswald F. Mingay, Radio and Electrical Engineer, Containing One or More Cuttings from Newspapers or Journals
 National Library of Australia. Trove; Articles Tagged Oswald Francis Mingay (website)  (200+ selected articles)
 Ross, John F. A History of Radio in South Australia 1897–1977 (J. F. Ross, 1978)
 Ross, John F. Radio Broadcasting Technology, 75 Years of Development in Australia 1923–1998 (J. F. Ross, 1998)

References

Australian electrical engineers
Australian public servants
1895 births
1973 deaths